The 2005 Hungaroring GP2 Series round was a GP2 Series motor race held on July 30 and 31, 2005 at the Hungaroring in Mogyoród, Pest, Hungary. It was the eighth round of the 2005 GP2 Series season. The race weekend supported the 2005 Hungarian Grand Prix.

Classification

Qualifying

Notes:
Both ART Grand Prix cars were demoted to the back of the grid after post-qualifying inspection discovered suspension irregularities in both of their cars, handing Neel Jani pole position.

Feature race

Sprint race

References

Hungaroring
GP2